was a venue for the performing arts in Nagoya, Aichi Prefecture, Japan. It closed on March 25, 2018.
The theatre was located inside the Chunichi Building. Performances such as kabuki and musicals were shown there.

See also 
Aichi Arts Center
Misono-za

References

External links 

Concert halls in Japan
Theatres in Nagoya
Tourist attractions in Nagoya
Former theatres in Japan